James Allan (born 21 September 1979) is the lead singer and guitarist of the Scottish rock band Glasvegas, and a former footballer.

Early and personal life
Born in Dalmarnock, Glasgow, he attended the city's St Mungo's Academy. Allan is a lifelong supporter of Celtic.

Allan's cousin is Glasvegas bandmate/guitarist Rab Allan. His sister Denise is the band's co-manager.

Football career

Allan played as a winger for Falkirk, Cowdenbeath, East Fife, Queen's Park, Gretna, Stirling Albion and Dumbarton, making 116 appearances in the Scottish Football League. He was part of the Cowdenbeath squad that won promotion as runners up in the 2000–01 Scottish Third Division.

Music career
During his football career, Allan decided to write songs and form a band. After touring Scotland for several years Glasvegas released four singles, before eventually being signed to Columbia. His songs deal with social issues such as psychopathic fathers ("Daddy's Gone"), murder ("Flowers & Football Tops") and the challenges of social work ("Geraldine"). He also wrote about homosexuality ("I Feel Wrong").

On 8 September 2009, a Tuesday, bandmates Rab Allan and Paul Donoghue announced that James Allan had been missing since the previous Friday, which resulted in a no-show at the Mercury Prize awards ceremony. However, he made a call to the band's manager on 9 September 2009 that he was safe and well in New York, where Glasvegas were about to embark upon a US tour supporting Kings of Leon. It is thought that the lack of communication sourced from Allan being without a mobile phone for six months, according to bandmates.

Allan cites Elvis Presley and Phil Spector as his main influences. He also says that Ian McCulloch of Echo and the Bunnymen is one of his inspirations.

References

1979 births
Living people
21st-century Scottish male singers
Footballers from Glasgow
Scottish rock guitarists
Scottish male guitarists
Scottish rock singers
Scottish footballers
Cowdenbeath F.C. players
East Fife F.C. players
Queen's Park F.C. players
Gretna F.C. players
Stirling Albion F.C. players
Dumbarton F.C. players
Scottish Football League players
People educated at St Mungo's Academy
Musicians from Glasgow
Association football wingers
Falkirk F.C. players
Dunipace F.C. players
Bridgeton–Calton–Dalmarnock
21st-century British guitarists